Allama Rashid-ul-Khairi, born as Mohammad Abdur Rashid and largely known as Musavire Gham (مصوّرِ غم), was a social reformer from British India. He is also one of the most celebrated literary names of Urdu literature. Khairi blended reformist and didactic teachings with literary works and is considered among the pioneers of Urdu short story. He was the father of urdu novelist Sadiq ul Khairi and grandfather of prominent jurist Haziqul Khairi. 

Khairi founded ISMAT in June 1908, a social and literary magazine for women that served the cause of Muslim women education in India and fought for their legal rights. He wrote more than ninety books and booklets, including Sath Ruhoon K Aamalnamay and Nani Ashu, two comedic works. Khairi's work depicts the circumstances of women during his time in the Indian subcontinent.

According to Munshi Premchand, "Rashid ul Khairi was a great name in literature for women in Urdu and all those who know Urdu language should be grateful to him." Gail Minault, Professor of History at the University of Texas, in her book Secluded Scholars wrote that, "Rashid ul Khairi was a pioneer of women's right in the Islamic tradition and was one of the biggest bestsellers in the history of Urdu Novel. He saw the oppression of women, their physical and mental imprisonment and how they were deprived of their rights and he wanted to do some thing about it." Renowned Urdu literature novelist Qurratulain Hyder stated, "Rashid ul Khairi was one of the greatest reformers of the nation in the twentieth century."

Literary Works 

 Samarna Ka Chand
 Subh-e-Zindagi
 Sham-e-Zindagi
 Shab-e-Zindagi
 Nauha-e-Zindagi
 Mah-e-Ajam
 Shaheen-o-Darraj
 Nani Ashu
 Jauhar-e-Ismat
 Mahboob-e-Khudawand
 Amna Ka Lal
 Aroos-e-Karbala
 Azzuhra
 Sarab-e-Maghrib
 Bintul Waqt
 Hayat-e-Saliha
 Syyeda Ka Lal

See also
Haziqul Khairi
Nazir Ahmad Dehlvi
Amina Nazli

References 

1868 births
1936 deaths
Urdu-language novelists
Urdu-language humorists
Urdu-language religious writers
Urdu-language writers from British India